Constance Amiot (born 1978) is a French writer-composer-performer of songs in French and English in an acoustic pop-folk style.

Born to French parents in Abidjan in the Ivory Coast, she grew up in Cameroon and the United States, settling in Paris in 2000. She began her music career as a pianist in a rock group named Virus that performed cover versions of Guns N' Roses songs, all the while pursuing her studies in law, literature and sound engineering. She adopted the guitar as her instrument of preference, influenced by artists like Tracy Chapman.

After a first self-produced album Whisperwood (2003), she next recorded an album in New York called Fairytale, (April 2007 on the Tôt ou tard label), with the participation of Jeff Pevar, Ben Wisch, Sean Pelton, François Moutin and the contribution of some lyrics by Jérôme Attal.

Discography
Whisperwood (2005)
Fairytale (2007), Tôt ou tard/Warner
Once Twice (2011), Tôt Ou Tard / Warner
Blue Green Tomorrows EP (2012), Believe Digital
12ème Parallèle (2014), Believe Digital

References

External links
 Site personnel

1978 births
Living people
People from Abidjan
Singers from Paris
French women pop singers
French expatriates in Ivory Coast
French expatriates in Cameroon
French expatriates in the United States
21st-century French women singers